Hrudaya Hrudaya is a 1999 Kannada-language romantic drama film directed by M. S. Rajashekar and produced by Parvathamma Rajkumar. The film stars Shiva Rajkumar, Ramesh Aravind and Anu Prabhakar, making her debut, whilst Sharath Babu, Avinash and Chitra Shenoy play the supporting roles. The film was a box office success.

The film featured original score and soundtrack composed by Hamsalekha. At the 1999-00 Karnataka State Film Awards, the film was awarded in 2 categories including Best Actor, Best Dialogue Writer.

Cast 
 Shiva Rajkumar as Ravi
 Ramesh Aravind as Dr Suresh
 Anu Prabhakar as Usha 
 Sharath Babu
 Avinash
 Chitra Shenoy
 Mandeep Roy
 Mico manju 
 Shankar Narayan 
 Venkatesh prasad 
 Hema bellur 
 Jyothi Gurucharan 
 Siddaraj Kalyankar
 Jayakumari
 Master Vinay Raghavendra 
 Jyotika

Soundtrack 
The music was composed and lyrics written by Hamsalekha. The audio was received with positive reviews with the song "O Premada Gangeye" sung by Rajkumar and K. S. Chitra topping the charts.

Production 
Newcomer Anu learned to drive for the film, because her character was to go into coma after a driving accident with a Fiat car.

Awards
 Karnataka State Film Awards (1999-2000)

 Best Actor - Shivarajkumar
 Best Dialogue writer - A. G. Sheshadri

References 

1999 films
1990s Kannada-language films
1999 romantic drama films
Films scored by Hamsalekha
Indian romantic drama films
Films directed by M. S. Rajashekar